Oil Township is one of seven townships in Perry County, Indiana, United States. As of the 2010 census, its population was 2,546 and it contained 531 housing units.

History
Oil Township took its name from Oil Creek.

The Jacob Rickenbaugh House was listed on the National Register of Historic Places in 1984.

Geography

Unincorporated towns
 Apalona at 
 Bandon at 
 Branchville at 
 Celina at 
 Doolittle Mills at 
 Oriole at 
 Saint Croix at 
(This list is based on USGS data and may include former settlements.)

Cemeteries
The township contains these sixteen cemeteries: Bangle, Colby, Ewing, German Ridge, Guillaume, Jeffries, Jones, Luxenburger, Miller, Rickenbaugh, Senn, Sprinkle, Underhill, Valley, Walker and Woolums.

Major highways
  Interstate 64
  Indiana State Road 37

School districts
 Perry Central Community School Corporation

Political districts
 State House District 73
 State Senate District 47

References
 
 United States Census Bureau 2009 TIGER/Line Shapefiles
 IndianaMap

External links
 Indiana Township Association
 United Township Association of Indiana
 City-Data.com page for Oil Township

Townships in Perry County, Indiana
Townships in Indiana